The Great Mendes Stela is a commemorative stele erected during the Ptolemaic dynasty by Ptolemy II Philadelphus for Mendes, Lower Egypt. Ptolemies III through V also had stelae: the bilingual, three-script Decree of Canopus and the Rosetta Stone.

External links
The Great Mendes Stela : English translation

3rd-century BC steles
Ptolemaic dynasty
Mendes